The 2017 Jiangxi International Women's Tennis Open was a professional tennis tournament played on hard courts. It was the 4th edition of the event, and part of the International category of the 2017 WTA Tour. It took place in Nanchang, China, from July 24 – 30, 2017.

Points and prize money

Point distribution

Prize money

Singles main draw entrants

Seeds

 Rankings are as of July 17, 2017

Other entrants
The following players received wildcards into the singles main draw:
  Wang Yafan
  Zheng Saisai
  Zheng Wushuang

The following players received entry from the qualifying draw:
  Harriet Dart
  Eri Hozumi
  Kang Jiaqi
  Lu Jingjing
  Xun Fangying
  You Xiaodi

The following player received entry as a lucky loser:
  Peangtarn Plipuech

Withdrawals
Before the tournament
  Ana Bogdan →replaced by  Peangtarn Plipuech
  Kristína Kučová →replaced by  Alla Kudryavtseva

Retirements
  Tereza Martincová
  Kristýna Plíšková

Doubles main draw entrants

Seeds

 Rankings are as of July 17, 2017

Other entrants
The following pairs received wildcards into the doubles main draw:
  Sun Xuliu /  Zheng Wushuang

Champions

Singles

  Peng Shuai  def.  Nao Hibino, 6–3, 6–2

Doubles

  Jiang Xinyu /  Tang Qianhui def.  Alla Kudryavtseva /  Arina Rodionova, 6–3, 6–2

References
Official website

2017
2017 WTA Tour
2017 in Chinese tennis
July 2017 sports events in China